This is a list of women artists who were born in Australia or whose artworks are closely associated with that country.

A
Anita Aarons (1912–2000), sculptor
Prue Acton (born 1943), fashion designer
Yilpi Adamson (born 1954), textile artist, painter
Hoda Afshar (born 1983), Iranian born, photographer
Alison Alder (born 1958), screenprinter
Joyce Allan (1896–1966), scientific illustrator
Micky Allan (born 1944), photographer
Beverly Allen (born 1945), botanical artist
Davida Allen (born 1951), painter, filmmaker, writer
Mary Cecil Allen (1893–1962), painter, writer
Lily Allport (1860–1949), oil painter, watercolourist
Edith Susan Gerard Anderson (1880–1961), painter, artist's model, writer
Ethel Anderson (1883–1958), painter and writer
Daisy Andrews (c. 1934/1935–2015), painter
Jean Appleton (1911–2003), painter, print maker
Jean Baptiste Apuatimi (1940–2013), painter
Kerry Argent (born 1960), illustrator
Elizabeth Armstrong (1859–1930), painter
Alison Marjorie Ashby (1901–1987), botanical artist
Olive Ashworth (1915–2000), artist, textile designer, photographer
Cristina Asquith Baker (1868–1960), painter, print maker
Mireille Astore (born 1961), Lebanese-born photographer, sculptor, performance artist, writer
Louisa Atkinson (1834–1872), illustrator, botanist, writer
Yvonne Audette (born 1930), painter
Australian poster collectives, 1960s, 70s and 80s, women were leaders in the poster collective movement
Narelle Autio (born 1969), photographer

B
Jeannie Baker (born 1950), British-born author and illustrator
Maringka Baker (born c. 1952), painter
Marie-Claire Baldenweg (born 1954), Swiss-born painter
Alice Marian Ellen Bale (1875–1955), painter
Bronwyn Bancroft (born 1958), fashion designer, illustrator
Jenny Bannister (born 1954), fashion designer
Shirley Barber (born 1935), author and illustrator
Irene Barberis (born 1953), English-born painter, installation artist, drawer
Agnes Barker (1907–2008), potter, craftworker
Caroline Barker (1894–1988), painter
Elsie Barlow (1876–1948), painter, printmaker
Gwen Barringer (1882–1960), watercolourist
Ethel Barringer (1883–1925), etcher
Nadia Bartel (born 1985), fashion designer
Del Kathryn Barton (born 1972), painter
Margaret Francis Ellen Baskerville (1861–1930), sculptor, painter
Zara Bate (1909–1989), fashion designer
Clarice Beckett (1887–1935), painter
Bianca Beetson, sculptor, painter, installation artist, photographer, ceramist
Dianne Beevers (born 1946), painter, printmaker, jeweller
Eugenie Keefer Bell (born 1951), jewellery designer, maker
Lisa Bellear (1961–2006), photographer, poet, dramatist, comedian
Jean Bellette (1908–1991), painter
Allana Beltran, performance artist
Charmaine Bennell (fl 2000s), illustrator
Jane Bennett (born 1960), painter
Portia Mary Bennett (1898–1989), painter
Eva Benson (1875–1949), sculptor
Danelle Bergstrom (born 1957), painter
Martha Berkeley (1813–1899), painter
Lauren Berkowitz (born 1965), painter
Dorothy Berry (born 1942), pastel artist
Moira Bertram (born 1929), comic artist, illustrator
Kate Beynon (born 1970), Hong Kong born, painter
Annette Bezor (1950–2020), painter
Vivienne Binns (born 1940), painter
Karna Maria Birmingham (1900–1987), painter, illustrator and print maker
Dorrit Black (1891–1951), painter, printmaker
Freya Blackwood (born 1975), illustrator, special effects artist
Florence Turner Blake (1873–1959), painter
Susannah Blaxill (fl 2000s), botanical artist
Elise Blumann (1897–1990), painter
Yvonne Boag (born 1954), painter
Boomalli Aboriginal Artists Cooperative (1987–), founded by ten Aboriginal artists, six of whom are women
Susie Bootja Bootja Napaltjarri (c. 1935–2003), painter
Marion Borgelt (born 1954), painter, installation artist, mixed media artist
Polly Borland (born 1959), photographer
Nancy Borlase (1914–2006), painter, art critic
Paula Bossio (fl 2000), illustrator
G. W. Bot (born 1954), printmaker, sculptor,  painter, graphic artist
Penny Bovell (born 1956), painter, art historian
Stella Bowen (1893–1947), painter
Doris Boyd (1888–1960), painter, ceramist
Edith Susan Boyd (1880–1961), painter and dramatist
Emma Minnie Boyd (1858–1936), painter
Tega Brain (fl 2012), digital artist
Joan Brassil (1919–2005), installation artist
Pat Brassington (born 1942), photographer, digital artist
Dorothy Mary Braund (1926–2013), painter
Kate Breakey (born 1957), photographer
Angela Brennan (born 1960), painter, ceramist
Lauren Brincat (born 1980), performance, installation artist
Zara Bate (fl 1970s), fashion designer
Florence Broadhurst (1899–1977), painter, fabric and wallpaper designer
Anmanari Brown, painter
Nyuju Stumpy Brown (1924–2011), indigenous painter
Janet Burchill (born 1955), contemporary artist, multiple disciplines
Lina Bryans (1909–2000), painter
Norma Bull (1906–1980), painter, printmaker, etcher
Frances Mary Burke (1904–1994), textile designer
Jane Burton (born 1966), photographer
Jessamine Buxton (1895–1966), painter and sculptor

C
Barbara Campbell (born 1961), performance and installation artist
Cressida Campbell (born 1960), printmaker
Joan Campbell (1925–1997), ceramist
Jane Cannan (1822–1861), painter, drawer
Frances Cannon (born 1992), painter, drawer
María Fernanda Cardoso (born 1963) installation artist
Ethel Carrick (1872–1952), painter
Milyika Carroll (born 1958), aboriginal artist
Karen Casey (1856–2021), interdisciplinary Palawa artist
Maie Casey, Baroness Casey (1892–1983), painter, illustrator
Judy Cassab (1920–2015), Austrian-born painter
Alex Cearns, photographer
Queenie Chan (born 1980), Hong Kong-born comic artist
Alice Chapman (1860–1929), painter
Dora Chapman (1911–1995), painter, silk-screen printer, potter and art teacher
Susien Chong (fl 2000s), fashion designer
Connie Christie (1908–1989), children's writer/illustrator, photographer and commercial artist
Julia Church (born 1959), painter, printmaker, graphic designer
Betty Churcher (1931–2015), painter and arts administrator
Margaret Cilento (1923–2006), painter, printmaker
Bree Kristel Clarke, photographer
Maree Clarke (fl 1990s), aboriginal artist
Sarah-Jane Clarke (fl 1999), fashion designer
Lorna Jane Clarkson (born 1964), fashion designer
Thelma Clune (1900–1992), sculptor, painter
Densey Clyne (1922–2019), Welsh-born photographer, naturalist, writer
Elaine Coghlan (1897–1989), painter, print maker
Kay Cohen (born 1952), fashion designer
Ola Cohn (1892–1964), sculptor
Bindi Cole (born 1975), photographer, video artist, installation artist
Amalie Sara Colquhoun (1894–1974), painter, stained glass artist
Sarah Contos, artist, installation artist 
Sylvia Convey (born 1948), Latvian-born painter and print maker
Justine Cooper (born 1968), animator, video artist, photographer
Jenny Coopes (born 1945), cartoonist
Megan Cope (born 1982), aboriginal artist, sculptor, video artist
Yvette Coppersmith (born 1980) painter
Edith Corbet (1846–1920), landscape painter
Olive Cotton (1911–2003), photographer
Virginia Coventry (born 1942), photographer
Theodora Cowan (1868–1949), sculptor, painter
Grace Cossington Smith (1892–1984), painter, illustrator
Sybil Craig (1901–1989), painter
Keri Craig-Lee (born 1958), fashion designer
Brenda L Croft (born 1964), artist, curator, writer, educator
Peggie Crombie (1901–1984), modernist painter
Grace Crowley (1890–1979), painter
Cecily Crozier (1911–2006), artist, poet, literary editor
Philippa Cullen (1950–1975), performance artist
Janet Cumbrae Stewart (1883–1960), painter
Elisabeth Cummings (born 1934), painter
Nici Cumpston (born 1963), painter, photographer
Virginia Cuppaidge (born 1943), contemporary abstract expressionist painter
Dagmar Evelyn Cyrulla (fl 1988), painter

D
Anne Dangar (1885–1951), painter, potter
Dolly Nampijinpa Daniels (1936–2004), painter
Beatrice Darbyshire (1901–1988), artist, printmaker
Vicki Darken (1923–2014), landscape painter
Liz Davenport (born 1945), fashion designer
Malpiya Davey (fl 2000s), aboriginal ceramist
Bessie Davidson (1879–1965), painter
Olive Blanche Davies (1884–1976/7), botanical illustrator
Pulpurru Davies (born 1940s), aboriginal artist
Debra Dawes (born 1955), painter
Janet Dawson (born 1935), painter
eX De Medici (born 1959), visual artist
Destiny Deacon (born 1957), photographer
Rachel Dean (fl 2010), fashion designer
Una Deerbon (1882–1972), potter
Linda Dement (born 1960), photographer, digital artist
Aileen Dent (1890–1978), painter
Maggie Diaz (1925–2016), photographer
Karla Dickens (born 1967), installation artist
Dorothy Djukulul (born 1942), painter and installation artist
Rosemary Dobson (1920–2012), illustrator
Shay Docking (1928–1998), landscape drawing
Annie Dorrington (1866–1926), painter, flag designer
Mel Douglas (born 1978), glass artist
Margaret Dredge (1928–2001), painter, print maker
Pippin Drysdale (born 1943), ceramist
Slawa Duldig (1901–1975), painter, interior designer
Lesley Dumbrell (born 1941), abstract painter
Jan Dunn (born 1940), ceramicist, potter, teacher
Elizabeth Durack (1915–2000), painter, writer
Olive Dutton Green (1878–1930), painter
Mikala Dwyer (born 1959), sculptor
Anne Dybka (1922–2007), English-born Australian glass engraver
Moya Dyring (1909–1967), painter

E
 Helen Eager (born 1952), painter, printmaker
Leona Edmiston (fl 2001), fashion designer
Margery Edwards (1933–1989), mixed media artist, painter
Pip Edwards (born 1980), fashion designer
Mary Edwell-Burke (1894–1988), painter
Bernice E. Edwell (1880–1962), painter
Sharyn Egan (born 1957), painter, sculptor, weaver
Frances Dolina Ellis (1900–1971), artist, printmaker, teacher 
Bonita Ely (born 1946), performance artist
Patricia Englund (1922–2004), painter and potter
Esther Erlich (born 1955), painter
Jessie Lavington Evans (1860–1943), painter
Joyce Evans (1929–2019), photographer
Megan Evans (fl 2000s), interdisciplinary artist
Mary Alice Evatt (1898–1973), painter, arts patron
Lina Eve (born 1946), painter, photographer, filmmaker, singer
Joyce Vera Mary Ewart (1916–1964), painter, graphic artist, teacher

F
Cherine Fahd (born 1974), photography, video performance
Mary Featherston (born 1943) interior designer, furniture designer, children's play and learning designer
Anne Ferran (born 1949), photographer
Susan Fereday (1810–1878), botanical artist
Susan Fereday (born 1959), photographer, installation artist
Tania Ferrier (born 1958), painter, installation artist, feminist fashion
Claire Field (fl 2010s), visual artist, curator
Janet Fieldhouse (born 1971), ceramic artist
Mary Finnin (1906–1992), painter and poet
Flamingo Park Frock Salon (1973–1992), Jenny Kee, Linda Jackson, fashion designers
Maude Edith Victoria Fleay (1869–1965), wildlife painter
Rosie Nangala Fleming (born 1928), painter
Emily Floyd (born 1972), public artist, sculptor, printmaker
Fiona Foley (born 1964), painter, printmaker, photographer, sculptor, installation artist
Sue Ford (1943–2009), photographer
Dorothea Francis (1903–1976), painter and illustrator
Camilla Franks (born 1976), fashion designer
Virginia Fraser (1947–2021), filmmaker, writer, curator, advocate for women artists
Zoe Freney, painter
Ella Fry (1916–1997), painter
Florence Fuller (1867–1946), South African-born painter
Mari Funaki (1950–2010), Japanese-born contemporary jeweller, metal-smith, sculptor

G
Sally Gabori / Mirdidingkingathi Juwarnda (1924–2015) artist
Kiley Gaffney (living), performance artist, musician
Silvana Gardner (born 1942), visual artist, writer
Rosalie Gascoigne (1917–1999), New Zealand-born sculptor
Marea Gazzard (1928–2013), sculptor, ceramist
Portia Geach (1873–1959), portrait painter, feminist
Anne Geddes (born 1956), photographer
Mary Gedye (1834–1876), painter
Karen Gee (born 1973), fashion designer
Diena Georgetti (born 1966), contemporary painter
Kate Geraghty (born 1972), photographer
Lisa Gervasoni (born 1969), photographer, strategic planner
May Gibbs (1877–1969), children's book illustrator, cartoonist, author
Topsy Gibson Napaltjarri (born c.1950), indigenous artist
Enid Gilchrist (c.1917–2007), fashion designer
Simryn Gill (born 1959) sculpture, photography, drawing, writing, publishing
Valerie Glover (fl 2002), collage artist using acrylics and mixed media
Anna Glynn (born 1958), contemporary visual artist
Mira Gojak (born 1963), sculptor
Agnes Goodsir (1864–1939), portrait painter
Lisa Gorman (fl 1999), fashion designer
Agatha Gothe-Snape (born 1980), artist (various media)
Elizabeth Gower (born 1952), abstract artist
Alma Nungarrayi Granites (1955–2017), Warlpiri artist
Jacqui Grantford (born 1967), painter, illustrator
Siv Grava (born 1967), visual artist
Elizabeth Gray (1837–1903), Irish-born painter, etcher
Virginia Grayson (born 1967), visual artist, winner of the Dobell Drawing Prize
Juli Grbac (born 1978), fashion designer
Denise Green (born 1946), painter
Jillian Green (born 1975), artist who explores spiritual themes
Rona Green (born 1972), printmaker, painter, drawer, sculptor
Nicki Greenberg (born 1974), comic artist, illustrator
Melanie Greensmith (born 1964), fashion designer
Ina Gregory (1874–1964), painter
Marion Mahony Griffin (1871–1961) artist, architect
Rhiana Griffith (born 1989), actress and painter
May Grigg (1885–1969), painter
Ann Grocott (born 1938), writer and painter
Joan Grounds (born 1939), ceramics, sculpture, sound art, film, performance art
Nornie Gude (1915–2002), painter
Henrietta Maria Gulliver (1886–1945), painter
Malaluba Gumana (born 1953), aboriginal painter
Norah Gurdon (1882–1974), painter
Margaret Gurney (born 1943), painter, graphic artist

H
Emma Hack (born 1972), photographer
Marie Hagerty (born 1964), artist, painter and teacher
Jenny Hale (born 1959), children's book illustrator, author
Fiona Margaret Hall (born 1953), photographer, sculptor
Deborah Halpern (born 1967), sculptor, mosaic artist, ceramist
Tina Haim-Wentscher (1887–1974), German-Australian sculptor
Alice Hambidge (1869–1947), painter
Michelle Hamer (born 1975), textile artist
Misses Jane and Mary Hampson (Jane 1873–1950, Mary 1868–1944), quilt makers
Lyn Hancock (born 1938), photographer, writer
Marjorie Hann (1916–2011), commercial artist and cartoonist
Tsering Hannaford (born 1987), painter
Barbara Hanrahan (1939–1991), painter, printmaker, writer
Florence May Harding (1908–1971), print maker, illustrator
Lily Nungarrayi Yirringali Jurrah Hargraves (born 1930), painter
Melinda Harper (born 1965), abstract artist
Katherine Hattam (born 1950), painter
Ponch Hawkes (born 1946), photographer
Maude Haydon (1886–1978), pastoral and landscape artist
Elaine Haxton (1909–1999), painter, print maker, commercial artist
Claire Healy (born 1971), installation artist in collaboration with Sean Cordeiro
Louise Hearman (born 1963), painter
Belynda Henry, landscape artist
Deirdre Henty-Creer (1918–2012), painter
Joy Hester (1920–1960), painter, poet
Nora Heysen (1911–2003), painter
Jacqueline Hick (1919–2004), painter
Alannah Hill (born 1962), fashion designer
Elvie Hill (1917–2018), fashion designer
Kit Hiller (born 1948), linocut printer, oil painter
Alice Hinton-Bateup (born 1950), artist, printmaker
Rhyl Hinwood (born 1940), sculptor
Noela Hjorth (1940–2016), painter, sculptor
Lisa Ho (born 1960), fashion designer
Naomi Hobson (born 1979), painter
Edith Lilla Holmes (1893–1973), painter
Elizabeth Honey (born 1947), illustrator
Paji Honeychild Yankarr (c.1912–2004), aboriginal artist
Greer Honeywill (born 1945), conceptual artist
Cherry Hood (born 1950), painter
Judy Horacek (born 1961), cartoonist
Margaret Horder (1903–1978), artist, children's book illustrator
Marie Horseman (1911–1974), cartoonist, illustrator, fashion designer
Valma Howell (1896–1979), painter, actress
Polly Hurry (1883–1963), painter
Margot Hutcheson (born 1952), British-born painter

I
Kylie InGold (born 1962), painter
Adelaide Ironside (1831–1867), painter
Pamela Irving (born 1960), ceramist, sculptor, printmaker
Jean Isherwood (1911–2006), painter
Linde Ivimey (born 1965), sculptor

J
Ethel Jackson Morris (1891–1995), illustrator
Linda Jackson (born 1950), fashion designer
Ann James (born 1952), children's book illustrator, graphic designer
Beril Jents (1918–2013), fashion designer
Natalie Jeremijenko (born 1966), installation artist
Carol Jerrems (1949–1980), photographer
Natasha Johns-Messenger (born 1970), installation artist, photographer
Helen Johnson (born 1979), painter, academic
Anne Jolliffe (1933–2021), animator
Peggy Napangardi Jones (1951–2014), painter
Ellen Jose (1951–2017), photographer, printmaker
Narelle Jubelin (born 1960), sculptor, printmaker, multimedia installation artist
Anne Judell (born 1942), drawer
Mabel Juli, (born c. 1933), painter
Kate Just, (born 1974), US-born, sculptor, textile artist

K
Shokufeh Kavani (born 1970), Iranian-born painter
Hanna Kay (living), Israeli-born painter
Jenny Kee (born 1947), fashion designer
Jennifer Keeler-Milne (born 1961), painter, drawer
Anwen Keeling (born 1976), portrait painter
Josepha Petrick Kemarre (born 1940s or 1950s), indigenous artist and painter
Tjungkara Ken (born 1969), painter
Caroline Kennedy-McCracken (born 1967), musician, painter, sculptor
Lucy Napaljarri Kennedy (born 1926), indigenous artist and painter
Rachel Khedoori (born 1964), painter, sculptor
Toba Khedoori (born 1964), mixed media painter
Ethel A. King (1879–1939), scientific illustrator
Inge King (1915–2016), German-born sculptor
Leah King-Smith (born 1956), photographer
Linda Klarfeld (born 1976), sculptor
Anita Klein (born 1960), painter, printmaker
Anastasia Klose (born 1978), performance artist, installation artist
Sue Kneebone (living), ceramicist, mixed media, photomontage
Emily Kngwarreye (1910–1996), artist, batiks, painter
Lisette Kohlhagen (1890–1969), painter
Yvonne Koolmatrie (born 1944), weaver
Eveline Kotai (born 1950), collage artist
Angkuna Kulyuru (born 1943), aboriginal batik artist and print maker

L
Vida Lahey (1882–1968), painter
Rosemary Laing (born 1959), photographer
Claire Lambe (born 1962), sculptor 
Pat Larter (1936–1996), mail artist, photographer, performance artist, painter
Janet Laurence (born 1947), mixed media artist, installation artist
Simone LeAmon (born 1971), designer, artist, curator
Helen Lempriere (1907–1991), painter
Alison Lester (born 1952), illustrator
Sandra Leveson (born 1944), painter, print maker
Mary Leunig (born 1950), cartoonist
Madeline Lewellin (1854–1944), painter, plant collector
Margo Lewers (1908–1978), interdisciplinary abstract artist
Bettina Liano (born 1966), fashion designer
Kay Lindjuwanga (born 1957), bark painter
Joan Lindsay (1896–1984), writer and visual artist
Ruby Lindsay (1885–1919), illustrator, painter
Mary Elizabeth Livingston (1857–1913), painter
Pamela Lofts (1949–2012), children's book illustrator, artist
Loongkoonan (c. 1910–2018), painter, Aboriginal elder
Gretta Louw (born 1981), multimedia and digital artist
Mildred Lovett (1880–1955), china painter
Fiona Lowry (born 1974), painter
Valerie Lynch Napaltjarri (born 1970), painter, print maker

M
Gail Mabo (born 1965), visual artist
Elisabeth MacIntyre (1916–2004), illustrator
Constance Jenkins Macky (1883–1961), Australian-American painter
Shirley Macnamara (born 1949), textile sculptor, painter
Mary Macqueen (1912–1994), printmaker, drawing, mixed media artist
Rosemary Madigan (1926–2019) sculptor, stonecarver, woodcarver
Ruth Maddison (born 1945) photographer
Bea Maddock (1934–2016), printmaker, painter, installation artist
Maguerite Mahood (1901–1989), painter, ceramist, printmaker
Hilarie Mais (born 1952), abstract painter, sculptor
Gillian Mann (1939–2007), printmaker
Diane Mantzaris (born 1962), digital artist, printmaker
Nonggirrnga Marawili (c1939-) painter, printmaker
Banduk Marika (1954–2021), artist, printmaker
Stella Marks (1887–1985), painter
Linda Marrinon (born 1959), painter, sculptor
Virginia Martin (fl 2010), fashion designer
Nerine Martini (1968–2019), installation artist 
Jenni Kemarre Martiniello (fl 2000s), aboriginal glass artist
Mervinia Masterman (1901–1998), illustrator
Helen Maudsley (born 1927), painter, visual essayist
Galuma Maymuru (born 1951), painter
Daphne Mayo (1895–1982), sculptor
Kathleen McArthur (1915–2001), botanical illustrator, environmentalist, naturalist
Alice McCall (fl 2004), fashion designer
Jennifer McCamley (born 1957), conceptual artist
Marie McMahon (born 1953) artist, printmaker
Georgiana McCrae (1804–1890), painter, diarist
Francine McDougall (living), filmmaker, photographer
Erica McGilchrist (1926–2014), painter, set and costume designer
Queenie McKenzie (c. 1920–1998), painter
Lucy McRae (born 1979), multimedia scientific fiction artist
Penny Meagher (1935–1995), painter
Lilian Marguerite Medland (1880–1955), illustrator, painter
June Mendoza (born 1924), portrait painter
Dora Meeson (1869–1955), painter
Annemieke Mein (born 1944), Dutch-born textile artist
Wolla Meranda (1863–1951), writer and illustrator
Mary Cockburn Mercer (1882–1963), painter
Bertha Merfield (1869–1921), painter, muralist
Lara Merrett (born 1971), visual artist
Angelica Mesiti (born 1976), video artist 
Sanné Mestrom (born 1979), sculptor
Margaret Michaelis-Sachs (1902–1985), Polish-born photographer
Jan Mitchell (1940–2008), painter, sculptor, illustrator, printmaker
Joanne Mitchelson (born 1971), painter
Tracey Moffatt (born 1960), photographer, filmmaker, video artist
Cheryl Moggs (living), watercolour painter, teacher
Anne Montgomery (1908–1991), painter, print maker, muralist
May and Mina Moore (May 1881–1931, Minna 1882–1957), photographers
Mirka Mora (1928–2018), French-born painter, sculptor, mosaic artist
Patricia Moran (1944–2017), painter
Harriet Morgan (1830–1907), natural history illustrator
Sally Morgan (born 1951), illustrator, author, dramatist
Christine Morrow (born 1971), British-born visual artist
Eirene Mort (1879–1977), artist, art teacher, printmaker, cartoonist, fashion designer
Celeste Mountjoy (living), artist, illustrator
Patricia Mullins (born 1952), children's book illustrator
Rerrkirrwanga Mununggurr (born 1971), bark painting
Josephine Muntz Adams (1862–1949), painter
Marrnyula Mununggurr (born 1964), aboriginal painter
Rerrkirrwanga Mununggurr (born 1971), aboriginal painter
Alice Jane Muskett (1869–1936), painter
Vali Myers (1930–2003), visual artist and dancer

N
Doreen Reid Nakamarra (c.1955–2009), painter
Ruth Nalmakarra (born 1954), indigenous painter and weaver
Rosella Namok (born 1979), painter
Narputta Nangala (1933–2010), painter
Yinarupa Nangala (born c.1960), indigenous painter
Biddy Rockman Napaljarri (born c.1940), Warlpiri indigenous artist and painter
Kitty Pultara Napaljarri (born c.1930), indigenous painter
Louisa Napaljarri (1930–2001), Warlpiri indigenous artist and painter
Mona Rockman Napaljarri (born c.1924), indigenous painter and potter
Ada Andy Napaltjarri (born c.1954), indigenous painter
Daisy Jugadai Napaltjarri (c. 1955–2008), painter
Eileen Napaltjarri (born 1956), indigenous painter
Helen Nelson Napaljarri (Born c.1949), aboriginal painter
Norah Nelson Napaljarri (born 1956), Warlpiri indigenous artist and painter
Sheila Brown Napaljarri (c.1940–2003), indigenous painter
Molly Jugadai Napaltjarri (c. 1954–2011), painter
Ngoia Pollard Napaltjarri (born c. 1948), painter
Nora Andy Napaltjarri (born c.1957), indigenous painter
Parara Napaltjarri (1944–2003), indigenous painter
Tjunkiya Napaltjarri (c. 1927–2009), painter
Wintjiya Napaltjarri (living), painter
Makinti Napanangka (1930–2011), Pintupi indigenous artist and painter
Dorothy Napangardi (died 2013), painter
Pansy Napangardi (born 1948), indigenous painter
Lily Kelly Napangardi (born c. 1948), painter
Yalti Napangati (born c. 1970), painter
Nell (born 1975) artist, performance, video, sculpture, painting
Jan Nelson (born 1955), sculptor, photographer, painter
Norah Nelson Napaljarri (born 1956), indigenous painter
Norie Neumark (living), American-born sound artist
Lucy Newell (1906–1987), painter, textile printer
Ann Newmarch (born 1945), painter, printmaker, sculptor
June Newton (1923–2021), photographer, actress
Kathleen Ngale (born c.1930), aboriginal Batik artist and painter
Mavis Ngallametta (1944–2019), painter, weaver
Hilda Rix Nicholas (1884–1961), painter
Philippa Nikulinsky (1942), painter, illustrator
Deborah Niland (born 1950), children's book illustrator, author
Kilmeny Niland (1950–2009), painter, illustrator
Rose Nolan (born 1959) visual artist
Susan Norrie (born 1953) painter, video artist
Bess Norriss (1878–1939), artist
Rosaleen Norton (1917–1979), painter, occultist
Gabriella Possum Nungurrayi (born 1967), contemporary indigenous artist
Naata Nungurrayi (born 1932), indigenous painter
Lena Nyadbi (born c. 1936), painter, installation artist

O
Denese Oates (born 1955), sculptor
Carla O'Brien (living), installation artist
Kathleen O'Brien (1914–1991), comic artist, illustrator, fashion artist
Mel O'Callaghan (born 1975) contemporary artist, video, performance, sculpture, installation, painting
Ailsa O'Connor (1921–1980), sculptor, painter, teacher, activist
Kathleen O'Connor (1876–1968), New Zealand-born painter
Helen Ogilvie (1902–1993), painter, printmaker
Pixie O'Harris (1903–1991), Welsh-born illustrator, cartoonist, painter, author
Dora Ohlfsen-Bagge (1869–1948), sculptor and medallist
Bronwyn Oliver (1959–2006), sculptor
Narelle Oliver (1960–2016), painter, print maker, illustrator
Margaret Olley (1923–2011), painter
Rosemary Opala (1923–2008), illustrator, writer, nurse
Mandy Ord (born 1974), comic artist
Raquel Ormella (born 1969), multimedia artist
Jan Ormerod (1946–2013), illustrator
Jill Orr (born 1952), performance artist, photographer, installation artist
Maria Josette Orsto (1962–2020) painter, printmaker, sculptor
Ida Rentoul Outhwaite (1888–1960), children's book illustrator

P
Ewa Pachucka (1936–2020), textile artist, sculptor
Margaret Paice (born 1920), commercial artist, illustrator
Josonia Palaitis (born 1949), painter
Polixeni Papapetrou (1960–2018), photographer
Wendy Paramor (1938–1975), painter, sculptor
Jacki Parry (born 1941), painter, print maker
Allyson Parsons (born 1965), landscape painter
Klytie Pate (1912–2010), ceramist
Esther Paterson (1892–1971), painter, cartoonist, book illustrator
Anelia Pavlova (born 1956), Bulgarian-born painter, printmaker, illustrator, ceramist
Sue Pedley (born 1954), multimedia artist
Adelaide Perry (1891–1973), artist, printmaker, art teacher
Katie Perry (born 1980), fashion designer
Gloria Petyarre (1942–2021), painter
Jeanna Petyarre (born 1950), painter
Kathleen Petyarre (c. 1940–2018), painter
Jeanna Petyarre (born 1950), painter
Nancy Petyarre (died 2009), painter
Caroline Phillips (born 1966), sculptor
Debra Phillips (born 1958), photographer, sculptor
Frances Phoenix (1950–2017), artist, needlework, poster designer
Patricia Piccinini (born 1965), mixed media artist, painter, sculptor, digital artist, installation artist
Julianne Pierce (living), new media artist, curator, art critic
Rosslynd Piggott (born 1958), installation artist. painter
Gwyn Hanssen Pigott (1935–2013), ceramist
Anne Pincus (born 1961), painter, sculptor
Lillian Louisa Pitts (1872–1947), photographer
Kerrie Poliness (born 1962), conceptual artist
Elizabeth Presa (born 1956), visual artist
Margaret Preston (1875–1963), painter, printmaker
Jane Price (1860–1948), painter
Elizabeth Prior (1929–2018), painter, sculptor,  ceramist
Thea Proctor (1879–1966), painter
Betty Kuntiwa Pumani (born 1963), painter
Angelina Pwerle (born c. 1946), painter
Minnie Pwerle (died 2006), painter
Mabel Pye (1894–1982), painter, print maker

Q
Mandy Quadrio, contemporary artist

R
Melinda Rackham (born 1959), digital artist
Stephanie Radok (born 1954), artist, writer, curator
Iso Rae (1860–1940), impressionist painter
Tamara Ralph (born 1981), fashion designer
Jessica Rankin (born 1971), embroiderer
Eugenia Raskopoulos (born 1959), photography, video art
r e a (born 1962), photographer, installation artist
Geraldine Rede (1874–1943), artist
Jacky Redgate (born 1955), sculptor, installation artist, photographer
Norma Redpath (1928–2013), painter, sculptor
Alison Rehfisch (1900–1974), painter
Susan Respinger (born 1982), portrait artist, muralist
Gladys Reynell (1881–1956), potter
Kate Rich (living), sound artist, video artist
Therese Ritchie (born 1961), contemporary artist, writer, graphic designer
Hilda Rix Nicholas (1884–1961), painter
Freda Rhoda Robertshaw (1916–1997), artist, painter 
Peggy Rockman Napaljarri (born c.1940), indigenous artist and painter
Toni Robertson (born 1953), visual artist, art historian printmaker
Amanda Robins (born 1961), painter, drawer
Julia Robinson (born 1981), sculptor, textile artist
Florence Aline Rodway (1881–1971), painter, drawer, portrait artist
Lisa Roet (born 1967), sculptor, drawer, photographer, filmmaker
Madeleine Rosca (born 1977), comic artist
Maggie Napaljarri Ross (born c.1940), aboriginal painter
Celia Rosser (born 1930), botanical illustrator
Joan Ross (born 1961), mixed media painter
Daisy Rossi (1879–1974), painter, interior designer
Caroline Rothwell (born 1967), sculptor, installation artist
Cybele Rowe (born 1963), ceramist
Rachel Roxburgh (1915–1991), painter, potter
Julie Rrap (born 1950), photographer, sculptor, painter
Carol Rudyard (1922–2021), visual artist
Nura Rupert (born c. 1933), printmaker, painter
Lola Ryan (1925–2003), shellworker
Rosemary Ryan (1926–1996), painter
Therese Ryder (born 1946), painter, linguist

S
Jenny Sages (born 1933), Chinese-born painter, illustrator
Yhonnie Scarce (born 1973), glass artist
Margaret Scobie (born 1948), aboriginal artist and painter
Joyce Scott (born 1942), painter and ceramist
Helena Scott (1832–1910), natural history illustrator
Nicola Scott (living), comic artist
Sheila Scotter (1920–2012), fashion designer
Margaret Senior (1917–1995), illustrator
Dora Serle (1875–1968), painter
Raelene Sharp (born 1957), portrait painter
Wendy Sharpe (born 1960), painter
Heather Shimmen (born 1957), painter, printmaker
Ivy Shore (1915–1999), painter
Irena Sibley (1943–2009), painter, illustrator
Dawn Sime (1932–2001), abstract painter
Norah Simpson (1895–1974), painter
Alexia Sinclair (born 1976), photographer
Sally Smart (born 1960), assemblage installation artist
Gemma Smith (born 1978), painter, sculptor
Grace Cossington Smith (1892–1984), painter, illustrator
Wendy Solling (1926–2002), sculptor
Clara Southern (1861–1940), painter
Bianca Spender (born 1977), fashion designer
Ruby Spowart (born 1928), photographer
Ethel Spowers (1890–1947), printmaker, illustrator
Robyn Stacey (born 1952), photographer, photo-artist
Paula Stafford (1920–2022), fashion designer
Miriam Stannage (1939–2016), painter, printmaker, photographer
Madonna Staunton (1938–2019), artist, poet
Sophie Steffanoni (1873–1906), landscape painter, embroiderer
June Ethel Stephenson (1914–1999), painter, printmaker
Amanda Stewart (born 1959), performance artist, poet
Janet Agnes Cumbrae Stewart (1883–1960), painter
Kunmanara Stewart (c.1938–2012), indigenous artist and painter
Mary Stoddard (1852–1901), Scottish-born painter
Constance Stokes (1906–1991), painter, drawer
Dorothy Stoner (1904–1992), painter
Marina Strocchi (born 1961), painter
Nora Sumberg (born 1956), landscape painter
Jane Sutherland (1853–1928), landscape painter
Ruth Sutherland (1884–1948), painter
Chern'ee Sutton (born 1996), contemporary visual artist
Heather B. Swann (born 1961), sculptor
Jo Sweatman (1872–1956), painter
Linda Syddick Napaltjarri (born c. 1937), painter
Eveline Winifred Syme (1888–1961), painter, printmaker

T
Takariya Napaltjarri (born c,1960), indigenous artist and painter
Jane Tanner (born 1946), children's book illustrator
Tjunkaya Tapaya (born 1947), aboriginal batik artist
Ruth Tarvydas (c. 1947–2014), fashion designer
Latai Taumoepeau (born 1972), contemporary artist
Pulya Taylor (born 1931), sculptor, craftsmaker, woodworker
Stephanie Taylor (1899–1974), artist, printmaker, gallerist, lecturer, art writer, broadcaster
Violet Teague (1872–1951), painter, mural designer
Kathy Temin (born 1968), synthetic fur artist
Betty Temple Watts (1901–1992), illustrator
Thancoupie (1937–2011) sculptor, artist
Shona Joy Thatcher {fl 2000), fashion designer
Margaret Thomas (1842–1929), painter, writer
Ann Thomson (born 1933), painter and sculptor
Lesbia Thorpe (1919–2009), printmaker
Emma Timbery (c. 1842–1916), shellworker
Esme Timbery (born 1931), shellworker
Wingu Tingima (died 2010), painter
Tjanpi Desert Weavers (from 1995) weavers
Topsy Tjulyata (born 1931), sculptor, craftsmaker, woodworker
Jasmine Togo-Brisby (born 1982), sculptor
Sophia Tolli (fl 2006), fashion designer
Aida Tomescu (born 1955), Romanian-born painter
Mollie Tomlin (1923–2009), painter
Mary Tonkin (born 1973), drawer
Jessie Traill (1881–1967), printmaker, painter
Barbara Tribe (1913–2000), sculptor, painter
Zoja Trofimiuk (born 1952), Czech-born sculptor, printmaker
Marie Tuck (1866–1947), painter, art educator
Ruth Tuck (1914–2008), painter
Maringka Tunkin (born 1959) artist, painter
Mazie Turner (1954–2014) painter, photographer, sculptor
Isabel May Tweddle (1875–1945), painter

U 
 Miriam-Rose Ungunmerr-Baumann (born 1950), painter, educator

V
May Vale (1862–1945), painter
Lesley Vanderwalt (living), makeup artist
Vicki Varvaressos (born 1949), painter
Vexta (living), stencil artist, street artist
Julie Vieusseux (1820–1878), painter
Savanhdary Vongpoothorn (born 1971), Laotian-born painter

W
Megan Walch (born 1967), painter
Anna Frances Walker (1830–1913), illustrator
Rose A. Walker (1879–1942), painter
Theresa Walker (1807–1876), sculptor, wax modeller
Anne Wallace (born 1970), painter
Kathleen Kemarre Wallace (born 1948), indigenous painter, custodian
Christian Waller (1894–1954), painter, writer, printmaker, illustrator, book designer, woodcutter, stained-glass artist
Lynette Wallworth (living), installation artist
Joan Walsh-Smith (born 1946), sculptor
Ania Walwicz (1951–2020), visual artist, poet
Rosie Ware (born 1959), textile designer, printmaker
Sera Waters (born 1979), textile artist, arts writer, arts educator
Jenny Watson (born 1951), painter 
Judy Watson (born 1959), multimedia artist
Lilla Watson (born 1940), mixed media artist
Betty Temple Watts (1901–1992), scientific illustrator
Louise Weaver (born 1966), mixed media artist
Johanna Weigel (1847–1940), fashion designer
Barbara Weir (born c. 1945), aboriginal painter
Carlene West (born c. 1945), painter
Katie West (living), interdisciplinary artist
Kaylene Whiskey (fl 2010s), indigenous artist
Ilka White (living), textile artist, sculptor
Susan Dorothea White (born 1941), painter, sculptor, printmaker
Wendy Whiteley (born 1941), landscape artist, flower artist
Ada Whiting (1859–1953), painter, miniaturist
Anne Wienholt (1920–2018), painter, sculptor, printmaker
Normana Wight (born 1936), painter, printmaker
Cathy Wilcox (born 1963), comic artist, children's book illustrator
Dora Wilson (1883–1946), British-born Australian painter and print maker
Ju Ju Wilson (fl 2000s), contemporary indigenous artist
Regina Pilawuk Wilson (fl 2000s), aboriginal artist
Justene Williams (born 1970), photographer, multimedia artist
Jan Williamson (living), painter
Ruby Tjangawa Williamson (c. 1940–2017), painter, woodworker
Dora Wilson (1883–1946), British-Australian painter and print maker
Ju Ju Wilson (living), painter, craftsmaker
Margery Withers (1894–1966), painter
Women's Domestic Needlework Group est 1976, traditional craft work
Maeve Woods (born 1933), painter, collage artist
Pauline Nakamarra Woods (born 1949), aboriginal artist and painter
Tjayanka Woods (born c. 1935), painter, weaver
Margaret Worth (born 1944), painter, screenprinter, sculptor
Judith Wright (born 1945), painter, videomaker, sculptor, printmaker

X
Bin Xie (born 1957), Chinese-born painter

Y
Paji Honeychild Yankarr (c. 1912–2004), painter
Yaritji Young (born c. 1956) painter
Gulumbu Yunupingu (1943–2012), indigenous artist
Nancy Gaymala Yunupingu (c.1935–2005), indigenous bark painter and print maker
Nyapanyapa Yunupingu (c. 1945–2021), painter

Z
Anne Zahalka (born 1957), photographer
Carla Zampatti (1942–2021), fashion designer
Aheda Zanetti (born 1967), fashion designer

References

-
Australian women artists, List of
Artists, List of Australian women
Artists